The Early Years Live is a video album of various live performances of the Dead Kennedys, filmed from 1978 to 1981 by Joe Reis, owner of the punk-centric video studio Target Video. It was officially released on VHS in July 1987 (and heavily pirated some years afterward) and on DVD in 2001.

The video also features, along with some of Target's trademark stock footage (battle footage, public domain movies, Ronald Reagan) and crude video graphics, news clips of lead singer Jello Biafra's 1979 San Francisco mayoral campaign.

The video is also notable for containing the only existing video footage of the original five-piece lineup of Dead Kennedys, which included original drummer Ted and second guitarist 6025. The band's more well-known drummer, D.H. Peligro, only appears on the live-in-studio performances shot at Target Video's Bay Area studio.

The performances, in order of appearance, are:

 "California über alles", Mabuhay Gardens, San Francisco, 1979
 "Kill the Poor", 330 Grove Street, San Francisco, 1979
 "Drug Me", Mabuhay Gardens, San Francisco, 1979
 "The Man with the Dogs", Mabuhay Gardens, San Francisco, 1980
 "Insight", Mabuhay Gardens, San Francisco, 1980
 "Let's Lynch the Landlord", Mabuhay Gardens, San Francisco, 1980
 "Bleed for Me", Target Video Studio, San Francisco, 1981
 "Holiday in Cambodia", Target Video Studio, San Francisco, 1981
 "Viva Las Vegas", Sproul Plaza, Berkeley, 1978

The performances of "Kill the Poor" and "Viva Las Vegas" were shot in black-and-white.

References 
 

Dead Kennedys albums
2001 live albums
2001 video albums
Live video albums
2001 compilation albums